Annapolis West Education Centre is a combined middle and high school in Annapolis Royal, Annapolis County, Nova Scotia, Canada.

See also
 List of schools in Nova Scotia

External links
 
News Update website

High schools in Nova Scotia
Schools in Annapolis County, Nova Scotia